Elizabeth Constance Bather OBE (11 October 1904 – 8 January 1988) was a British Women's Auxiliary Air Force and police officer who served as the second commander of the London Metropolitan Police's A4 Branch (Women Police), from 1946 to 1960 and was the first female police officer in the United Kingdom to be promoted to Chief Superintendent when the rank was introduced into the Metropolitan Police in 1949.

Bather was born in Winchester, where her father was a housemaster at Winchester College. She was educated at St Swithun's School in the city. From 1937 to 1946 she was a magistrate in Winchester, one of the youngest in the country, and also a member of Hampshire County Council.

She joined the Women's Auxiliary Air Force (WAAF) with the rank of Company Assistant in April 1939. She served in Bomber Command, rising to be Senior Staff Officer in charge of WAAFs, and also went to Canada in 1941 to help set up the Canadian Women's Auxiliary Air Force. She was promoted Squadron Officer in March 1942 and Wing Officer in January 1945 and was appointed Officer of the Order of the British Empire (OBE) in the 1946 New Year Honours.

In 1945 Bather joined the Metropolitan Police with the rank of Chief Inspector and the following year succeeded Superintendent Dorothy Peto as head of women police, being promoted to Superintendent herself. At 5 feet 4 inches, she only barely met the minimum height standard for the force.

Bather attempted to "feminise" the force, redesigning the uniform in 1946 and allowing policewomen to wear makeup on duty. In 1946 she also removed the bar to married women joining and serving policewomen getting married which had been in force since the 1920s. She gave evidence to the Wolfenden Committee in favour of decriminalising homosexuality.

References
Biography, Oxford Dictionary of National Biography
Biography, Who Was Who

1904 births
1988 deaths
People from Winchester
People educated at St Swithun's School, Winchester
Royal Air Force officers
Women Metropolitan Police officers
Officers of the Order of the British Empire
Metropolitan Police officers